Rosemarie Weiß-Scherberger (19 July 1935 – 20 July 2016) was a German fencer. She won a bronze medal in the women's team foil event at the 1964 Summer Olympics.

References

External links
 

1935 births
2016 deaths
German female fencers
Olympic fencers of the United Team of Germany
Fencers at the 1960 Summer Olympics
Fencers at the 1964 Summer Olympics
Olympic bronze medalists for the United Team of Germany
Olympic medalists in fencing
Medalists at the 1964 Summer Olympics
Universiade medalists in fencing
Universiade gold medalists for West Germany
Medalists at the 1959 Summer Universiade
Sportspeople from Freiburg im Breisgau